Implode is the tenth full-length studio album by industrial group Front Line Assembly. The album was released through Metropolis on April 27, 1999.

Release and promotion
Implode was released on digipak CD and via Zoth Ommog on gatefold cover sleeve double vinyl with limited circulation of 2,000.
The track "Torched" is featured in the 2002 horror film Resident Evil but not on the accompanying soundtrack.

Originally, Implode was supposed to be the last Front Line Assembly release for Metropolis.

Singles
Implode was followed by the release of two singles. The single "Prophecy" includes the original version, a radio edit and a remix of the title track. "Unknown Dreams" is also featured as radio edit. "Paralysis" is a non-album track. The second single, "Fatalist", was released in different versions in Europe and North America. German label Zoth Ommog issued a four-track single that contains remixes of "Fatalist" (Rhys Fulber), "Retribution" (Front 242) and "Prophecy" (Haujobb) as well as non-album track "Deception". The six track version was released for the Scandinavian countries through Energy and in the United States through Metropolis. Additional tracks on this version are two remixes of "Fatalist" by Aqualite and Tribal Techno.

Touring
Front Line Assembly went on North America tour in October and November 1999 with Dutch rock band and label colleagues Clan of Xymox as support.

Track listing

Personnel

Front Line Assembly
 Bill Leeb – production, vocals
 Chris Peterson – production, performer

Additional musicians
 Jed Simon – guitar

Technical personnel
 Dan Handrabur – additional programming, additional production
 Greg Reely – mixing, editing
 Sean Thingvold – assistant editing
 Ted Jansen – mastering
 Dave McKean – design, photography, illustration
 Max McMullin – 3-D programming

References

Front Line Assembly albums
1999 albums
Metropolis Records albums
Albums with cover art by Dave McKean
Zoth Ommog Records albums
Albums produced by Chris Peterson (producer)